TUKS Rugby League Football Club is a South African rugby league football club based at the University of Pretoria in Pretoria, Gauteng. They compete in the Rhino Cup as TUKS Reds and in the Protea Cup as the TUKS Blues. They have won the Rhino Cup twice in a row.

Jerseys

Primary

Alternative

Players and Staff

Current squad

Notable players 
 Riaan Engelbrecht

Coaching set-up

See also 
Sport in South Africa

References

External links 

Rugby league in South Africa
Rugby league teams
Rugby clubs established in 2005
University and college rugby league clubs